Portrait of the Dwarf Nano Morgante is a 1552 double-sided painting offering front and back views on either side of the canvas by Bronzino of Nano Morgante (nickname of Braccio di Bartolo) the famed buffoon dwarf of Cosimo I de' Medici, Grand Duke of Tuscany who is also immortalized in Valerio Cioli's Fontana del Bacchino at the Boboli Gardens in Florence.  The work was commissioned from Bronzino by Cosimo.  It portrays Morgante on both sides as a bird-catcher, as he was not permitted to hunt bigger game, this being a pursuit reserved for persons of greater echelon. Morgante is depicted respectively from the front and back at two subsequent moments of the action: at the front we see him before the hunt, holding an owl in a snare to be used as a bait to capture a jay that is flying in the air. A duo of rare swallowtail butterflies cover his genitals; these were discovered recently, when the painting was last restored. From behind, we see him just about to turn towards the viewer, anxious to visually boast of his take.
 
At this time Bronzino was involved in the great Florentine debate laid down by Giorgio Vasari called "Paragone", sculpture versus painting. Of course Bronzino came down on the side of painting, so he painted this two-sided front and back   portrait of Morgante to retort the argument that a subject could be seen from more angles in sculpture.

In 2010 this work was restored, after many years of neglect, and placed on permanent display in its own glass case in the Palazzo Pitti.

References

1560 paintings
Florence
Mannerism
Paintings by Bronzino